A Maxwell material is the most simple model viscoelastic material showing properties of a typical liquid. It shows viscous flow on the long timescale, but additional elastic resistance to fast deformations.   It is named for James Clerk Maxwell who proposed the model in 1867.  It is also known as a Maxwell fluid.

Definition 

The Maxwell model is represented by a purely viscous damper and a purely elastic spring connected in series, as shown in the diagram.  In this configuration, under an applied axial stress, the total stress,  and the total strain,  can be defined as follows:

where the subscript D indicates the stress–strain in the damper and the subscript S indicates the stress–strain in the spring.  Taking the derivative of strain with respect to time, we obtain:

where E is the elastic modulus and η is the material coefficient of viscosity.  This model describes the damper as a Newtonian fluid and models the spring with Hooke's law.

If, instead, we connect these two elements in parallel, we get the generalized model of a solid Kelvin–Voigt material.

In a Maxwell material, stress σ, strain ε and their rates of change with respect to time t are governed by equations of the form:

or, in dot notation:

The equation can be applied either to the shear stress or to the uniform tension in a material. In the former case, the viscosity corresponds to that for a Newtonian fluid. In the latter case, it has a slightly different meaning relating stress and rate of strain.

The model is usually applied to the case of small deformations. For the large deformations we should include some geometrical non-linearity. For the simplest way of generalizing the Maxwell model, refer to the upper-convected Maxwell model.

Effect of a sudden deformation 

The phenomenon is known as stress relaxation.

The picture shows dependence of dimensionless stress  
upon dimensionless time :

If we free the material at time , then the elastic element will spring back by the value of

Since the viscous element would not return to its original length, the irreversible component of deformation can be simplified to the expression below:

Effect of a sudden stress 

If a Maxwell material is suddenly subjected to a stress , then the elastic element would suddenly deform and the viscous element would deform with a constant rate:

If at some time  we would release the material, then the deformation of the elastic element would be the spring-back deformation and the deformation of the viscous element would not change:

The Maxwell model does not exhibit creep since it models strain as linear function of time.

If a small stress is applied for a sufficiently long time, then the irreversible strains become large. Thus, Maxwell material is a type of liquid.

Effect of a constant strain rate 
If a Maxwell material is subject to a constant strain rate then the stress  increases, reaching a constant value of 

In general

Dynamic modulus 
The complex dynamic modulus of a Maxwell material would be:

Thus, the components of the dynamic modulus are :

and

The picture shows relaxational spectrum for Maxwell material.

See also
Burgers material
Generalized Maxwell model
Kelvin–Voigt material
Oldroyd-B model
Standard linear solid model
Upper-convected Maxwell model

References

Non-Newtonian fluids
Materials science
James Clerk Maxwell